is a 1993 Japanese horror film directed by Toshiharu Ikeda. Despite its international title, it is not connected to the "Evil Dead Trap" series in any way.

Cast
 Shirō Sano as Tetsuro Muraki
 Megumi Yokoyama as Yoko Mizuhashi
 Kimiko Yo as Nami Muraki
 Tatsuo Yamada as Keiji Muto

References

External links
 
 Evil Dead Trap 3: Broken Love Killer at the Japanese Movie Database 

1993 horror films
Films directed by Toshiharu Ikeda
Japanese horror films
Japanese sequel films
Japanese slasher films
1993 films
1990s Japanese films